Sarah is an unincorporated community in Tate County, Mississippi, United States.

Although an unincorporated community, Sarah has a post office and a zip code of 38665.

Education
The Sarah community is served by the Tate County School District.

Transportation
 Mississippi Highway 3
 Canadian National Railway passes through the Sarah community.

Notoriety
On 25 April 2001, Jan Michael Brawner Jr. murdered his father-in-law (Carl Albert Craft), mother-in-law (Martha Jane Craft), ex-wife (Barbara Faye Craft Brawner) and his 3-year-old daughter (Candice Paige Brawner) at the Craft home in the Sarah Community. Brawner was found guilty on four counts of capital murder by jury trial in the Circuit Court of Tate County and was sentenced to death. Brawner was executed by lethal injection at Mississippi State Penitentiary on 12 June 2012.

Gallery

References

External links

 Canadian National Railway – Crenshaw to Sarah, MS 7/27/2018

Unincorporated communities in Tate County, Mississippi
Unincorporated communities in Mississippi
Memphis metropolitan area